Veit Brecher Wittrock (5 May 1839 at district of Dalsland – 1 September 1914 in Stockholm) was a Swedish botanist known for his work in the field of phycology and for his research of the genus Viola.

Biography 
From 1857 to 1865 he studied at the University of Uppsala, then spent the next thirteen years as a gymnasium teacher in Uppsala. In 1878 he became an associate professor at the University of Uppsala. From 1879 to 1904 he served as a professor and curator of the botanical collections at the Naturhistoriska riksmuseet in Stockholm. In Stockholm, he was also a professor and director of the Bergianska trädgården (1879–1914).

Botanical eponymy 
 Wittrockia: Bromeliad genus circumscribed by Carl Axel Magnus Lindman in 1891.
 Wittrockiella: Algae genus circumscribed by Nordal Wille in 1909.

Selected works 
 Försök till en monographi öfver algslägtet Monostroma, 1866.
 Algologiska studier. I och II, 1867.
 Dispositio oedogoniacearum suecicarum, 1870.
 Prodromus monographiae oedogoniearum, 1874.
 "On the development and systematic arrangement of the Pithophoraceæ, a new order of algae", 1877.
 Skandinaviens gymnospermer, 1887.
 Viola studier (1895–1897; 2 volumes).
 Botanisk-historiska fragment, 1906.
 (As editor): Acta horti Bergiani. Meddelanden från Kungl. Svenska vetenskaps-akademiens Trädgård Bergielund.

References 

1839 births
1914 deaths
People from Dalsland
Uppsala University alumni
Academic staff of Uppsala University
Swedish botanists
Swedish phycologists
Members of the Royal Society of Sciences in Uppsala